eMarketer, now Insider Intelligence, is a subscription-based market research company that provides insights and trends related to digital marketing, media, and commerce.

History
eMarketer was founded in 1996, and is headquartered in New York City. 93 percent of the company was acquired as a subsidiary by Axel Springer, in June 2016, for $242 million.

Products and services

Corporate subscription 
Subscribers have access to eMarketer's data via a web-based client portal. Within the database, analysts, forecasters, and researchers publish industry reports, forecasts, comparative estimates, charts, articles, interviews, case studies, web conferencing and videos. The company curates, compares, and contextualizes information from global sources to provide macro-level understanding of digital trends related to advertising, marketing, media and commerce.

References

External links

Market researchers
Companies based in New York City